Dongye is an unincorporated town located in Shawan County, Xinjiang Uyghur Autonomous Region, China, it was known for the seat of the former 122nd Regiment headquarters of the 8th Division, Xinjiang Production and Construction Corps, one of settlements in the Xinjiang Production and Construction Corps. The town is 83 kilometers southeast of Shihezi City, and 8 kilometers north of Shawan County. As of 2000 census, the town had a population of 17,724.

"Dong" means the east, "Ye" means the Xiayedi. the town of Dongye was named after its location in the east of Xiayedi. Dongye Town is located in the southern margin of the Junggar Basin and was founded in 1955. The streets in the town are neatly arranged, mainly Yucai Road, Shiji Avenue, Yixin Road, Dongpao Road, Zhongxin Road and Guxin Road. The residential area covers an area of 5.32 square kilometers, with a population of about 9,000, and there are more than 90 commercial outlets such as shopping malls.

References 

Xinjiang Production and Construction Corps
Populated places in Xinjiang